Over the years, talk show host Oprah Winfrey has won the following awards and nominations for her Media Works:

Academy Awards

Acapulco Black Film Festival
1999: Black Film Award for Best Actress: Beloved : Nominated

Daytime Emmy Awards 

 2011: Chairman's Award
 1998: Lifetime Achievement Award
 2014: Outstanding Special Class Series: Super Soul Sunday
 1998: Outstanding Talk Show Host: The Oprah Winfrey Show
 1997: Outstanding Talk Show: The Oprah Winfrey Show
 1996: Outstanding Talk Show: The Oprah Winfrey Show
 1995: Outstanding Talk Show: The Oprah Winfrey Show
 1995: Outstanding Talk Show Host: The Oprah Winfrey Show
 1994: Outstanding Talk Show: The Oprah Winfrey Show
 1994: Outstanding Talk Show Host: The Oprah Winfrey Show
 1993: Outstanding Talk Show Host: The Oprah Winfrey Show
 1993: Outstanding Children's Special: ABC Afterschool Specials
 1992: Outstanding Talk Show: The Oprah Winfrey Show
 1992: Outstanding Talk Show Host: The Oprah Winfrey Show
 1991: Outstanding Talk Show: The Oprah Winfrey Show
 1991: Outstanding Talk Show Host: The Oprah Winfrey Show
 1989: Outstanding Talk Show: The Oprah Winfrey Show
 1987: Outstanding Talk Show Host: The Oprah Winfrey Show

Golden Globe Award

Jefferson Awards for Public Service
 1998: S. Roger Horchow Award for Greatest Public Service by a Private Citizen

NAACP Image Award
 1989: Outstanding News, Talk or Information - Series or Special: Oprah Winfrey: On Location in Forsyth County
 1991: Entertainer of the Year
 1992: Outstanding News, Talk or Information - Series or Special: The Oprah Winfrey Show
 1992: Outstanding News, Talk or Information - Series: The Oprah Winfrey Show 
 1993: Outstanding News, Talk or Information - Series or Special: The Oprah Winfrey Show
 1994: Outstanding News, Talk or Information - Series or Special: The Oprah Winfrey Show 
 1995: Outstanding News, Talk or Information - Series or Special: The Oprah Winfrey Show 
 1996: Outstanding News, Talk or Information - Series: The Oprah Winfrey Show
 1998: Outstanding News, Talk or Information - Series: The Oprah Winfrey Show
 1998: Outstanding News, Talk or Information - Special: Dinner With Oprah: A Lifetime Exclusive - Toni Morrison 
 2005: Hall of Fame
 2012: Outstanding Talk Series: Oprah's Lifeclass

Nominated:
 1999: Outstanding Lead Actress in a Motion Picture: Beloved
 2013: Outstanding Talk Series: Oprah's Lifeclass
 2013: Outstanding Talk Series: Oprah's Lifeclass
 2014: Outstanding News/ Information (Series or Special): Oprah: Where Are They Now?
 2014: Outstanding Talk Series: Oprah's Lifeclass
 2014: Outstanding Talk Series: Oprah's Next Chapter
 2015: Outstanding News/ Information (Series or Special): Oprah's Lifeclass
 2015: Outstanding Talk Series: Oprah Prime
 2015: Outstanding Variety (Series or Special): Oprah's Master Class
 2015: Outstanding Supporting Actress in a Motion Picture: Selma
 2016: Outstanding News/ Information (Series or Special): Oprah Prime: Celebrating Dr. King and the Selma Marches 50 Years Later
 2016: Outstanding News/ Information (Series or Special): Oprah: Where Are They Now?
 2017: Outstanding Talk Series: Super Soul Sunday

Peabody Awards
 1995: Personal Award

People's Choice Awards
 1988: Favorite Talk Show Host: Won
 1997: Favorite Female Television Performer: Won
 1998: Favorite Female Television Performer: Won
 2004: Favorite Talk Show Host: Won

Nominated:
 2005: Favorite Daytime Talk Show Host
 2006: Favorite Daytime Talk Show Host
 2007: Favorite Talk Show Host 
 2008: Favorite Talk Show Host

Presidential Medal of Freedom
 2013:  Presidential Medal of Freedom

Primetime Emmy Award

PGA Awards
 1999: Producer of the Year: Tuesdays with Morrie

Tony Awards

See also 

 List of people who have won Academy, Emmy, Grammy, and Tony Awards#Three awards (non-competitive)

References

External links 

 Oprah Winfrey Awards
 Oprah Winfrey Awards at Museum.tv.

Winfrey, Oprah
Awards